Colonel Königsfels Teaching Prince Poniatowski to Ride is a 1773 oil on canvas painting by Bernardo Bellotto, now in the National Museum, Warsaw.

It shows Prince Józef Poniatowski on a grey Lipizzan executing a pesade, wearing the uniform of the royal horse guards of the Polish–Lithuanian Commonwealth. To the right Colonel Piotr Königsfels, holding a staff and a tricorn, gives the sign for the pesade. In the background is an arch bearing the Ciolek-Poniatowski coat of arms.

References

1773 paintings
Paintings in the collection of the National Museum, Warsaw
Paintings by Bernardo Bellotto
Konigsfels
Konigsfels
Oil on canvas paintings